William Fishbaugh or Fishbough may refer to:

 William Fishbaugh, defender of the Alamo
 William A. Fishbaugh (1873–1950), American commercial photographer
William Fishbough, scribe of Andrew Jackson Davis

See also
William Fishbourn, mayor of Philadelphia